The Old Bell is a Grade II listed public house at 16 Exeter Street and 23 Wellington Street, Covent Garden, London, WC2.

It was built in 1835. It is now a branch of the pub chain Be At One.

References

Covent Garden
Buildings and structures completed in 1835
19th-century architecture in the United Kingdom
Grade II listed pubs in the City of Westminster